Villeneuve-sur-Lot (in the Languedocien dialect of Occitan language: Vilanuèva d'Òlt ) is a town and commune in the southwestern French department of Lot-et-Garonne. The commune was formerly named Villeneuve-d'Agen.

Villeneuve-sur-Lot is located 22 km northeast of the commune of Agen and straddles the river Lot.

History
Villeneuve was founded in 1254 by Alphonse, Count of Poitiers, brother of Louis IX, on the site of the town of Gajac, which had been deserted during the Albigensian Crusade.

By the early 20th century, Villeneuve-sur-Lot was an important agricultural centre and had a large trade in plums (prunes d'ente); the preparation of preserved plums and the tinning of peas and beans were major industries. The important mill of Gajac stood on the bank of the Lot a little above the town.

Population

Sights
On the left bank, portions of the 13th century ramparts, altered and surmounted by machicolations of the 15th century, remain, and high square towers rise above the gates to the north-east and southwest, known respectively as the Porte de Paris and Porte de Pujols.

On the right bank, boulevards have for the most part taken the place of the ramparts. Arcades of the 13th century surround the Place La Fayette, and monumental houses of the 13th, 14th and 15th centuries are to be seen in various parts of the town. The church of St Etienne is late Gothic style. On the left bank of the Lot, 3 km S.S.W. of Villeneuve, are the 13th-century walls of Pujols located.

The buildings of the formet abbey of Eysses, about 2 km to the N.E., are mainly from the 17th century and serve as a departmental prison and penitentiary settlement. The principal hospital, the hospice St Cyr, is a pretty building standing in beautiful gardens.

The Pont De La Liberation, which spans the Lot river, is a  arch bridge built between 1910 and 1919. When it was completed it was the largest single span concrete arch in the world. It was designed by Eugène Freyssinet, one of the pioneers in using reinforced concrete.

Notable people
Mikaël Brageot (born 1987), pilot, Red Bull Air Race competitor
Benoît Broutchoux (1879–1944), anarchist
Nicolas Cazalé (born 1977), actor
Charles Derennes (1882–1930), writer, winner of the 1924 edition of the Prix Femina
Georges Leygues (1857–1933), politician of the Third Republic
Caroline Paulus (born 1959), actress, fashion model and singer

Twin towns – sister cities

Villeneuve-sur-Lot is twinned with:
 Ávila, Spain
 Bouaké, Ivory Coast
 Neustadt bei Coburg, Germany
 San Donà di Piave, Italy
 Troon, Scotland, United Kingdom

See also
 US Villeneuve, a rugby league club from Villeneuve-sur-Lot
 In Villeneuve-sur-Lot's town hall there is a bust of Marianne by Georges Saupique

References

External links

Official website
Rugby Club Villeneuvois

Communes of Lot-et-Garonne
Subprefectures in France
Agenais